You've Changed is an album by saxophonist Jimmy Heath featuring performances recorded in Denmark in 1991 and released on the SteepleChase label.

Reception

David Dupont at AllMusic noted "You've Changed presents journeyman saxophonist Jimmy Heath in an unadorned setting that exhibits his talents in full splendor."

Track listing
All compositions by Jimmy Heath except as indicated
 "Soul Eyes" (Mal Waldron) – 8:13   
 "Sleeves" – 9:21   
 "Bluesville" (Sonny Red) – 7:14   
 "You've Changed" (Victor Young) – 8:19   
 "Basic Birks" – 7:29   
 "Last Night When We Were Young" (Harold Arlen, E.Y. "Yip" Harburg) – 7:12   
 "Sassy Samba" – 6:36   
 "Prince Albert" (Kenny Dorham) – 8:10

Personnel
Jimmy Heath – tenor saxophone, soprano saxophone
Tony Purrone – guitar
Ben Brown – bass
Albert "Tootie" Heath – drums

References

SteepleChase Records albums
Jimmy Heath albums
1992 albums